The Houku River, also known as the Houjue River or Houjue Creek, is a  river of southern Taiwan, and a tributary of the Zengwen River. The Nanhua Dam on the river is a major source of drinking water for metropolitan Kaohsiung.

See also
List of rivers of Taiwan

References

Rivers of Taiwan
Landforms of Chiayi County
Landforms of Kaohsiung
Landforms of Tainan